The England national cricket team toured New Zealand in February and March 1971 and played a two-match Test series against the New Zealand national cricket team. England won the series 1–0 with one match drawn.

Test series summary

First Test

Second Test

References

1971 in English cricket
1971 in New Zealand cricket
New Zealand cricket seasons from 1970–71 to 1999–2000
1970-71
International cricket competitions from 1970–71 to 1975